Wooden Ships and Iron Men is a computer wargame published by Avalon Hill in 1987 for the Commodore 64.

Gameplay
This game is based on the naval board wargame, Wooden Ships and Iron Men. In the combat phase, the final outcome is revealed when the computer declares a winner.

Reception
In 1988, Dragon gave the game 2 out of 5 stars. Computer Gaming World stated that "many of the good qualities of the boardgame have been nicely translated", but criticized the computer opponent that was both weak and unable to fight in scenarios with land. It concluded with the hope that the game would presage the conversion of other large, classic boardgames to the computer. In 1990, the magazine gave the game two-plus stars out of five, and in 1993 gave it one-plus stars, calling it "A board game classic and a computer game disaster ... poor graphics and play value".

See also
Wooden Ships and Iron Men (1996)

References

External links

1987 video games
Avalon Hill video games
Commodore 64 games
Commodore 64-only games
Computer wargames
Video games based on board games
Video games developed in the United States